Nyctanassa is a genus of night herons from the Americas, especially (but not exclusively) warmer coastal regions. They were formerly included in the genus Nycticorax, but today all major authorities recognize them as different.

The name comes from Ancient Greek words for "night" and "lady" or "queen", referring to the yellow-crowned night heron's nocturnal activity and its beauty.

Species

References

 

Peterson, Alan P.  (Editor). 1999. Zoological Nomenclature Resource  (Zoonomen).  Accessed 2007-7-29.
Remsen, J. V., Jr., C. D. Cadena, A. Jaramillo, M. Nores, J. F. Pacheco, M. B. Robbins, T. S. Schulenberg, F. G. Stiles, D. F. Stotz, and K. J. Zimmer. [Version 2007-07-29.] A classification of the bird species of South America. American Ornithologists' Union. Accessed 2007-04-10.

 

Bird genera